Arenocoris fallenii is a herbivorous species of true bug in the family Coreidae. It is a small, speckled, variably coloured insect, between 6 and 7 mm long as an adult.

References

Pseudophloeinae
Insects described in 1829
Hemiptera of Europe